Panchasayar is a neighbourhood of East Kolkata in the Indian state of West Bengal.

Geography

Police district
Panchasayar police station is part of the East division of Kolkata Police. It is located at Srinagar Main Road, New Garia Supermarket, Kolkata-700 094.

Education
Panchasayar Shiksha Niketan, a Bengali-medium co-educational institution, was established in 1988. Swagatam Halder, of Panchasayar Shiksha Niketan, topped the merit list of the higher secondary examination of the West Bengal Council of Higher Secondary Examination in 2016.

Healthcare
Peerless Hospital and B.K.Roy Research Centre, belonging to the Peerless Group, is a 400-bed multi-speciality hospital.

References

External links
 – it includes list of guest houses in Panchasayar

Neighbourhoods in Kolkata